Jean Zinn-Justin (born 10 July 1943 in Berlin) is a French  theoretical physicist.

Biography
Zinn-Justin was educated in physics (undergraduate 1964) at the École Polytechnique, and did graduate work in theoretical physics at Orsay, (Ph.D. 1968) under the supervision of  Marcel Froissart.
 
Zinn-Justin has worked since 1965 as a theoretical and mathematical physicist at the Saclay Nuclear Research Centre (CEA), where he was head of theoretical physics in 1993−1998 . He has served as a visiting professor at 
the Massachusetts Institute of Technology (MIT),   Princeton University,   State University of New York at Stony Brook (1972), and  Harvard University, and further guest scientists at  CERN. From 1987 to 1995 he was Director of the  Les Houches summer school for theoretical physics. In 2003 he became leader of DAPNIA (Department of Astrophysics, Particle Physics, Nuclear Physics and Associated Instrumentation) at Saclay. 
 
He has made  seminal contributions to the renormalizability of gauge theories. He is a world authority on Quantum Field Theory in particle and Phase transitions in statistical physics, and, in particular, the Renormalization group organizing and connecting these two areas. He has written definitive books on the subject.
 
In 1977, he was awarded the Paul Langevin Prize of the Société Française de Physique; in 1981 the Ampère prize of the French Academy of Sciences; in 1996 the Gentner-Kastler Prize of the Société Française de Physique  jointly with the Deutsche Physikalische Gesellschaft (DPG); in 2003 the Gay-Lussac-Humboldt prize. In 2011, he was elected to the French Academy of Sciences.

Notes

Books
Quantum Field Theory and Critical Phenomena, Clarendon Press, Oxford, 1989, 1993, 1996, 2002, 2021 
Path Integrals in Quantum Mechanics, Oxford University Press, 2005, 
Phase Transitions and Renormalization Group, Oxford University Press, 2007,  
From Random Walks to Random Matrices, Oxford University Press, 2021,

External links
Scientific publications of Jean Zinn-Justin on INSPIRE-HEP

Zinn-Justin's author  page

1943 births
Living people
Theoretical physicists
Fellows of the Institute of Physics
Mathematical physicists
French physicists
École Polytechnique alumni
People associated with CERN
Members of the French Academy of Sciences